Arudy (Gascon: Arudi) is a commune in the Pyrénées-Atlantiques department in the Nouvelle-Aquitaine region of south-western France.

The inhabitants of the commune are known as Arudyens or Arudyennes.

The commune has been awarded one flower by the National Council of Towns and Villages in Bloom in the Competition of cities and villages in Bloom.

Geography
Arudy is located in the Ossau Valley on a bend on the Gave d'Ossau some 20 km south-east of Oloron-Sainte-Marie and 16 km south of Gan. Access to the commune is by the D920 road from Buzy in the north passing through the commune just west of the town and continuing to Louvie-Juzon in the south. Access to the town is by the D53 connecting to the D920. The D287 also goes east from the town to join the D934 going north to Sévignacq-Meyracq. The D918 branches west from the D920 near the town and continues west through the north of the commune to Lurbe-Saint-Christau.

The SNCF railway line from Buzy-en-Béarn - Laruns which passed through the commune was closed to traffic for passengers on 2 March 1969. A bus connection remained in place until 1 September 2009. Freight traffic between Buzy-en-Béarn and Arudy survived until 2003. The facilities have now been dismantled.

The western hills of the commune are heavily forested with farmland in the valleys. The east of the commune in the Ossau Valley is mainly residential with some farmland.

Hydrography
Located in the Drainage basin of the Adour, the Gave d'Ossau forms the eastern border as it curves around the town and continues west, forming the northern border of the commune, to join the Gave d'Aspe to form the Gave d'Oloron at Oloron-Sainte-Marie. Many tributaries rise in the south of the commune and flow north to join the Gave d'Ossau including the Lamisou, the Arrec de Baycabe, the Ruisseau du Bois de Nougué, the Arrec de Lacerbelle, and the Ruisseau du Termy which forms the western border of the commune.

Places and Hamlets

 L'Abat (Drinking trough)
 L'Abétat (Col de)
 Anglès
 Angous
 Arrabiot
 Arrouge (ruins)
 L'Aubisqué
 Bareilles
 Barguères
 Bélier
 Bérastou
 Bersaut (Ravine)
 Béteilles
 Blingou (Turoun - 433 metres)
 Bordedela (spring)
 Bourdeu
 Brousset
 Caillabère
 Caillou-Marrau
 Camanère
 Carrey
 Casajus
 Cabanes de Castillou
 Cazassus
 Cortès-Granges
 Crest (Lake)
 Cumarty
 Daré Bourdeu
 Etchaux
 Florence
 Garrail
 Cabane de Garrietche
 Gerbadure (Col de - 1198 metres)
 Goubert
 Habarra
 Heugacète (Col de)
 Hondaa
 Houn Barrade (Col de)
 Hourgolle
 Les Jardins d'Arudy
 Jugist
 Laborde (two places)
 Lacoste
 Lacrabère
 Ladebeze
 Granges Lafont
 Lanne
 Larroun
 Lascoungues
 Laüs
 Lissert
 Louraou (Drinking trough)
 Loustau
 Pouey Maou
 Malarode
 Manaut
 Mancesta (Ravine)
 Martouré
 Maysonnave
 Médalou
 Miégaville
 Mourlane
 Cité Notre-Dame
 Nougué
 L'Oustalot
 Pédestarrès (ruins)
 Pène de Plou (468 metres)
 Le Pic d'Ossau
 Pierris
 Pouts
 Saint-Cricq
 Saubiron
 Sépé (Spring)
 Séré
 Soubirou
 Soumabielles (ruins)
 Terranère
 Tilhou
 Tocortoure
 Trois-Auges (Fountain)
 Le Turon (530 mètres)
 Vignau
 Le Zoum

Neighbouring communes and villages

Toponymy
The commune name in béarnais is Arudi.

According to Michel Grosclaude the name comes from the basque harr ("stone" or "rock") and uri ("town").

The following table details the origins of the commune name and other names in the commune.

Sources:
Raymond: Topographic Dictionary of the Department of Basses-Pyrenees, 1863, on the page numbers indicated in the table. 
Grosclaude: Toponymic Dictionary of communes, Béarn, 2006 
Cassini: Cassini Map from 1750

Origins:
Ossau: Titles of the Ossau Valley
Pardies: Notaries of Pardies (Monein)
Chéronnet: Bernard Chéronnet
Luntz: Contracts retained by Luntz
Reformation: Reformation of Béarn
Insinuations: Insinuations of the Diocese of Oloron 
Census: Census of Béarn
Marca: Pierre de Marca, History of Béarn.

History

The first traces of civilisation in the commune date to Prehistory or more precisely to the Magdalenian period. Excavations in four caves in the commune (Maladore, Poeymaü, Saint-Michel, and Espalungue) uncovered bones, tools, and many snail shells.

The village of Eruri or Aruri was mentioned at the beginning of the 13th century. It was from the beginning of that time that the Ossau Union was created which permitted relative independence for the communes in the valley until the French Revolution.

Paul Raymond noted on page 14 of his 1863 dictionary that the commune had a Lay Abbey, vassal of the Viscounts of Béarn, with 86 fires and depended on the bailiwick of Ossau.

It was in the 19th century that economic growth started in the commune. Sawmills and Marble quarries were created which provided a living to several hundred people. One quarry still operates today.

On 29 February 1980 Arudy was the epicentre of an earthquake measuring 5.2 on the Richter scale and 7.5  on the MSK scale which damaged many buildings in the town. The college had to be rebuilt.

Heraldry

Administration

List of Successive Mayors

Inter-communality
The commune is part of six inter-communal structures:
 the Communauté de communes de la Vallée d'Ossau;
 the local public management agency;
 the association for the perception of Arudy;
 the water association for the Ossau Valley;
 the electrification association for Bas-Ossau;
 the SIVU for sanitation for the Ossau Valley;

Demography
In 2017 the commune had 2,229 inhabitants.

Economy
Arudy has diverse economic activities:
the commune has a large sheep breeding centre and strong activity related to hunting. Arudy forms part of the Appellation d'origine contrôlée (AOC) zone designation of Ossau-iraty;
the commune conserves and operates marble (gray-black) and limestone quarry sites. The Church of St. Severus in Assat, for example, was built in 1873 with Arudy limestone;
There are wood and marble working industries;
the Messier industrial foundry, a subsidiary of Ventana Aerospace Group, employs approximately 200 people. The foundry produces alloys of magnesium-thorium intended for the aviation industry. The machining of these materials has resulted in the production of waste containing thorium. 13.3 tonnes of the residue of thorium-magnesium alloys (Grime from the foundry, shavings from machining, miscellaneous scrap, etc.) are stored in a special location with a radioactivity of 1.9 GBq from thorium-232. The company faces economic difficulties and has been placed in a Judicial Recovery procedure by the Commercial Court on the 1 April 2010. The Commercial Court of Pau approved exit from the Judicial recovery safeguard procedure proposed by management and the court administrators of the Messier foundry in July 2011. Messier Foundry is a prime contractor in the CARAIBE collaborative project approved by the Aerospace Valley Pôle de compétitivité group and funded by the Fonds unique interministériel (Single inter-ministerial funds) programme.

Culture and heritage

Civil heritage
The Hôtel Pouts (17th century) is registered as an historical monument. It is an ancient Lay Abbey which later became a police station. The building was renovated in 1971 to house a museum: the Maison d'Ossau.

The Maison d'Ossau museum in the Hôtel Pouts displays regional archaeological collections, specimens of flora and fauna of the Pyrenees, and local costumes.

Arudy has 16th and 17th century houses, a bridge said to be Roman, and Lavoirs (public laundries) from the 19th century.

Religious heritage

The Church of Saint-Germain (12th century, renovated in the 19th century) contains several items classified as historical objects:
A Statue: Saint Germain (17th century)
A Painting: Saint Germain the Auxerrois at prayer (17th century)
A Retable on the main altar (17th century)
A Processional cross: Saint Lucie (18th century)
A Paschal Candlestick (17th century)

The interior of the chapel of Saint-Michel is decorated with paintings by Pierre Martinez.

Environmental heritage
The Abétat peaks at 1204 metres, the Gerbadure at 1254m, the Soum Counée at 1361m, the Bersaut at 1368m, the Hourquettes de Baygrand at 1386m, the Senzouens (or the Breque) at 1392m, and the Pic d'Escurets at 1440m.

Amenities

Education

The town has a public college, and one primary school. Another private primary school has been closed since the beginning of September 2011.

Sports and sports facilities
ES Arudy is a Rugby club which plays in Fédérale 3;
TCO tennis club provides coaching by a qualified instructor. They have three tennis courts: one clay court and two fast courts;
The Arudy rock-climbing school is one of the busiest in the region. It consists of three main areas with over a hundred climbing routes fitted out.

Notable people linked to the commune
Jean Darriule, born on 16 November 1774 at Arudy, was a French Lieutenant-General. His name features on the Arc de Triomphe in Paris.
Georges Penabert, born on 23 April 1825 at Arudy
Édouard Piette, born in 1827, directed the Upper Paleolithic excavation site in Arudy.
Jean-Baptiste Dortignacq, born on 25 April 1884 at Arudy, he was a road racing cyclist.
Robert Barran, born on 13 January 1918 at Arudy, he was a Rugby league and Rugby union player.
Georges Laplace, French anthropologist, born in 1918 and died in 2004 at Pau, in 1970 he founded the centre for stratigraphic Paleo-ethnology at Arudy.

Bibliography
René Arripe, Ossau 1900: The Canton of Arudy, Loubatières, Toulouse, 1990 
René Arripe, Ossau Valley 2000: The Canton of Arudy, R. Arripe, 2004, 782 pages

See also
Ossau Valley
Communes of the Pyrénées-Atlantiques department
Route nationale 618
Col d'Aubisque

References

External links
Arudy on the 1750 Cassini Map

Communes of Pyrénées-Atlantiques